St. Edward Central Catholic High School is a private, Roman Catholic high school in Elgin, Illinois.  It is located in the Roman Catholic Diocese of Rockford and competes athletically in the Metro Suburban Conference.

St. Edward Central Catholic was established in 1941 by the Adrian Dominican Sisters.  It was named after St. Edward the Confessor and in honor of Bishop Edward Francis Hoban, 2nd Bishop of the Rockford diocese.

External links
 School website

References

Roman Catholic Diocese of Rockford
Catholic secondary schools in Illinois
Elgin, Illinois
Educational institutions established in 1941
Schools in Kane County, Illinois
1941 establishments in Illinois